Hans Rigotti (born 15 May 1947) is a German former footballer.

References

External links

1947 births
Living people
German footballers
Association football defenders
FC Bayern Munich footballers
1. FC Nürnberg players
Stuttgarter Kickers players
Bundesliga players